Isaac Norris (October 3, 1701 – June 13, 1766) was a merchant and statesman in provincial Pennsylvania.

Early life and education
Isaac Norris was born in Philadelphia in 1701, the son of Isaac Norris, a prosperous Quaker merchant and original participant in William Penn's establishment of the colony of Pennsylvania and Mary Lloyd. Isaac was educated at the Friends' School in Philadelphia, and went abroad in 1722 and 1734–1735.

Business
After his schooling in London, Norris returned to manage the family business, Norris and Company, on behalf of his ailing father. After his father died in 1735, the junior Isaac became a senior partner.

Marriage and family
Well established after inheriting money and property from his father, in 1739 Norris married Sarah Logan, the eldest daughter of James Logan. Logan was a former Mayor of Philadelphia and former Governor of the Pennsylvania Colony, and one of the wealthiest men in the English Colonies. In 1742, the Norris' moved out of Philadelphia and resettled at the Norris family estate, Fairhill in what is now the Northern Liberties section of Philadelphia.

Political career
Engaged in business until 1743, Norris had acquired a large fortune, in addition to what he inherited from his father. He retired from business to devote himself to politics and public life.

Politics
Like his father before him, Norris entered into politics at an early age. He served as a councilman and alderman, a member of the Pennsylvania Provincial Assembly in 1734, and chairman of its most important committees. He was a Quaker of the strictest sect, and endeavored to keep the policy of Pennsylvania consistent with the principles of his religion. On the prospect of war with France and Spain in 1739, he opposed the organization of volunteer companies and preparation for the defense of the province. His followers, in opposition to the war party, were known as the "Norris party," and his subsequent election to the assembly was the occasion of violent political struggles between the Quakers and other residents of the city.

He was one of the commissioners to treat with the Albany Indians in 1745 and 1755, and he and his colleagues effected the purchase of several million acres comprising the southwestern part of Pennsylvania.

In 1751, he was elected speaker of the Pennsylvania Provincial Assembly, and held that office fifteen years. In the first year of his administration, the statehouse bell was ordered from England. Norris proposed that its inscription should be: "Proclaim liberty throughout the land unto all the inhabitants thereof," based on the Bible's book of Leviticus, chapter 25, verse 10.

During his speakership, the colonial representatives and the proprietaries had a long conflict about the taxation and legislative control of the Penn family estates. A leader of the Quakers, Norris joined the opponents of privilege. In a debate in the Assembly he declared, "No man shall ever stand on my grave and say, 'Curse him, here lies he who betrayed the liberties of his country!'"

In 1754 he was selected as a member of the Pennsylvania delegation, led by Benjamin Franklin, that attended the Albany Congress, a gathering of numerous colonial representatives to plan an approach to their defenses before the pending French and Indian War, the North American front of the Seven Years' War between Great Britain and France. Together with Benjamin Chew and Richard Peters), also of Philadelphia, he was on the committee that reviewed plans and chose Franklin's Albany Plan to propose to the full conference.

In 1757, Norris was appointed with Benjamin Franklin as a commissioner to England to work for the removal of grievances related to the proprietary instructions, but declined on account of failing health. Although he opposed the encroachments of the Penns, he would not support the proposition to convert Pennsylvania into a royal province. He resigned his speakership when, in 1764, a petition to that effect passed the Assembly.

Re-elected in the next election, Norris resigned again. Due to poor health, he retired shortly thereafter. He died at his estate "Fairhill". His death marked the passing of the Quakers'  strong influence in Pennsylvania's politics, as more people of other backgrounds came to power.

Scholar
Norris was an excellent French, Latin, and Hebrew scholar, collected a valuable library, and was active in educational and benevolent enterprises. He served as a trustee of the College and Academy of Philadelphia, now the University of Pennsylvania from 1751 until his resignation in 1755.

Daughter
Norris's daughter was Mary Norris Dickinson, who married John Dickinson.

References

Biographical sketch and portrait at the University of Pennsylvania
"Isaac Norris", by George W. Norris, The Pennsylvania Magazine of History and Biography, Vol. 1, No. 4 (1877), pp. 449–454.

External links
The books of Isaac Norris at Dickinson College

1701 births
1766 deaths
American Quakers
Members of the Pennsylvania Provincial Assembly
Politicians from Philadelphia
People of colonial Pennsylvania
University of Pennsylvania people
Colonial American merchants
18th-century American politicians